The Morgantown Marathon is a 42.195 km (26.2 mi) race run through the seven wards of Morgantown, West Virginia. Its inaugural run was held in 2015. An official time from the Morgantown Marathon can be used as a qualifying event for the Boston Marathon. In addition to the full marathon race, the Morgantown Marathon also includes an 8K race (‘The Mountain Mama 8K”) and a half-marathon.

The 2020 edition of the race was cancelled due to the coronavirus pandemic, with all registrants given the option of transferring their entry to 2021 or obtaining a full refund.

Course 

The Morgantown Marathon is notable for its difficult course. Although the marathon course begins and ends at the WVU Coliseum—home of West Virginia University basketball games—runners navigate numerous elevation changes over the intermediate 26.2 miles. The final mile is among the steepest sections of the course, rising from the downtown area adjacent to the Monongahela River to finish line at the WVU Coliseum.

Tagline 
The Morgantown Marathon's tagline is "26.2 Almost Heavenly Miles." This motto comes from the song "Take Me Home, Country Roads" by John Denver where the state is referred to as "almost heaven."

Winners 
Key:

Notes

References

External links 
 Morgantown Marathon

Marathons in the United States
Sports competitions in West Virginia
Half marathons in the United States
Sports in West Virginia
Annual sporting events in the United States